Bode-Holtemme was a Verwaltungsgemeinschaft ("collective municipality") in the district of Harz, in Saxony-Anhalt, Germany. It was situated along the rivers Bode and Holtemme, east of Halberstadt. The seat of the Verwaltungsgemeinschaft was in Wegeleben. It was disbanded on 1 January 2010.

The Verwaltungsgemeinschaft Bode-Holtemme consisted of the following municipalities:

 Groß Quenstedt 
 Harsleben 
 Nienhagen 
 Schwanebeck
 Wegeleben

Former Verwaltungsgemeinschaften in Saxony-Anhalt